"King Size Papa" is a 1948 novelty song by Julia Lee and her Boy Friends.  The song, penned by Johnny Gomez and Paul Vance (Paul Vandervoort II), was released on the Capitol Americana label.  The song peaked at number one on the US Billboard R&B chart. and number 15 on the national pop chart.

In popular culture
In the late 1990s and early 2000s, the song was used by Pillsbury in its "Grands! biscuits" television commercials; its double entendre lyrics served to describe the atypically large size of the product. 
A version of this song was also used in the 1999 Eddie Murphy and Martin Lawrence comedy Life.

References

1948 songs
Novelty songs
Hokum blues songs